Jordan Devey (born January 11, 1988) is an American football offensive guard who is a free agent. He played college football at Memphis. He was signed as an undrafted free agent with the Baltimore Ravens. Devey has also played for the New England Patriots, San Francisco 49ers, Kansas City Chiefs, and Oakland Raiders.

Professional career

Baltimore Ravens
On April 27, 2013, he signed with the Baltimore Ravens as an undrafted free agent.

New England Patriots
On September 5, 2013, Devey was signed to New England's practice squad after an off-season stint. He spent the 2014 preseason seeing action at center, guard and tackle. In the 2014 season, Devey was promoted to the active roster. In the regular season, Devey started six games at guard. The Patriots won Super Bowl XLIX  after they defeated the Seattle Seahawks, 28-24.

San Francisco 49ers
On August 18, 2015, Devey was traded to the San Francisco 49ers for tight end Asante Cleveland. On March 8, 2016, 49ers decided to tender a one-year contract to Devey. On May 6, 2016, the 49ers waived Devey.

Kansas City Chiefs
On May 9, 2016, the Kansas City Chiefs claimed Devey off waivers from the 49ers. On September 4, 2016, he was waived by the Chiefs and signed to the practice squad the next day. He was elevated to the active roster on September 17, 2016. He was released by the Chiefs on November 5, 2016 and was re-signed to the practice squad three days later. He signed a reserve/future contract with the Chiefs on January 19, 2017. He was released on September 7. He was re-signed on September 9, 2017.

On March 16, 2018, Devey re-signed with the Chiefs. He played in the first seven games, starting two at guard and center due to injuries, before being placed on injured reserve with a torn pectoral.

Oakland / Las Vegas Raiders
On March 21, 2019, Devey signed with the Oakland Raiders on a one-year deal. He was placed on injured reserve on October 5, 2019.

On April 2, 2020, Devey was re-signed by the Las Vegas Raiders. He was released on September 1, 2020.

Buffalo Bills
On September 9, 2020, Devey was signed to the Buffalo Bills practice squad. He was elevated to the active roster on October 24 and January 8, 2021, for the team's week 7 and wild card playoff games against the New York Jets and Indianapolis Colts, and reverted to the practice squad after each game. He was promoted to the active roster on January 12, 2021.

Devey signed a one-year contract extension with the team on February 1, 2021. He was released on August 31, 2021.

References

External links
Memphis Tigers bio
Baltimore Ravens bio

Living people
1988 births
Baltimore Ravens players
Buffalo Bills players
Kansas City Chiefs players
Las Vegas Raiders players
Memphis Tigers football players
New England Patriots players
Oakland Raiders players
People from American Fork, Utah
Players of American football from Utah
San Francisco 49ers players